Andreas Lars Dackell (born 29 December 1972) is a Swedish former professional ice hockey player. He played for several seasons with Brynäs IF in the Swedish league Elitserien (SEL) and was drafted by the Ottawa Senators in the sixth round of the 1996 NHL Entry Draft.

Playing career
In Ottawa he was well suited as a defence-minded forward, who scored few goals but played an important role on the penalty kill and when trying to keep leads.

After acquiring Bill Muckalt from the New York Islanders the Senators traded Dackell due to his more expensive contract. He was traded to the Montreal Canadiens during the 2001 draft for a seventh round pick.

Dackell saw less success in Montreal than he had in Ottawa. During the 2004–05 lockout he returned to Brynäs IF, and remained there until the end of his career.

In the 2011–12 season, Dackell went through a knee surgery in October 2011 and only played 16 games in the regular season. After 6 playoff games, Dackell announced his retirement, citing his knee injury.

Career statistics

Regular season and playoffs

International

References

External links
 

1972 births
Living people
Brynäs IF players
Ice hockey players at the 1994 Winter Olympics
Medalists at the 1994 Winter Olympics
Montreal Canadiens players
Olympic gold medalists for Sweden
Olympic medalists in ice hockey
Ottawa Senators draft picks
Ottawa Senators players
People from Gävle
Swedish expatriate ice hockey players in Canada
Swedish ice hockey right wingers
Sportspeople from Gävleborg County